Bodon is a rural locality (a selo) in Barguzinsky District, Republic of Buryatia, Russia. The population was 234 as of 2010. There are 5 streets.

Geography 
Bodon is located 51 km northeast of Barguzin (the district's administrative centre) by road. Suvo is the nearest rural locality.

References 

Rural localities in Barguzinsky District